Osokorskaya is a rural locality (a village) in Cheryomushskoye Rural Settlement of Kotlassky District, Arkhangelsk Oblast, Russia. The population was 37 as of 2010. There is 1 street.

Geography 
Osokorskaya is located 16 km south of Kotlas (the district's administrative centre) by road. Peschanitsa is the nearest rural locality.

References 

Rural localities in Kotlassky District